Eric Asamany (born 14 June 1997) is a Ghanaian footballer who currently plays as a forward for Ghana Premier League side WAFA.

Career

2019–20 season 
Asamany started his professional career with West African Football Academy, drafted into the senior team in May 2019 and made his debut in the 2019 GFA Committee Special Competition. He played his first match for WAFA on 5 May 2019 after coming on in the 80th minute for Forson Amankwaah in a 4–0 away loss to Accra Hearts of Oak. He featured in six matches at the end of the competition. Asamany scored his debut goal in the Ghana Premier League after first goal on a 2–0 victory over Ebusua Dwarfs in the 18th minute before coming off for Daniel Owusu in the 67th minute who came on to score the second goal, which was his debut goal as well. He went on to score match winning goals against Great Olympics and a 90th-minute goal against Berekum Chelsea to help WAFA snatch three points in both matches. He scored five goals in all competition, with four coming in the league, which was the highest by any WAFA player within the season, 2019–20 season before the league was cancelled due to the COVID-19 pandemic in Ghana.

2020–21 season 
Ahead of the 2020–21 season, he was seen as the main forward for WAFA, however on match day 4 in a match against Eleven Wonders in on 5 December 2020, he picked up an injury and had to sit out for six months before returning in June 2021 and playing 45 minutes of a 1–1 draw against Dreams FC during match day 29.

Style of play 
Asamany idolizing Cristiano Ronaldo. He plays as a centre forward and he posses the strength and good positioning to as a pivot and displace defenders allow for goal scoring opportunities. He has been described as a player with a good creative ability and decision making in terms of scoring.

Personal life 
Asamany supports Real Madrid. He stated in an interview that he hopes in following Ghanaian compatriots Michael Essien and Daniel Opare in playing for the Los Blancos.

References

External links 
 

Living people
1997 births
Association football forwards
Ghanaian footballers
West African Football Academy players
Ghana Premier League players